Vas is a frazione of Quero Vas and a former comune (municipality) in the province of Belluno in the Italian region of Veneto, located about  northwest of Venice and about  southwest of Belluno.

The municipality of Vas contained the frazioni (subdivisions, mainly villages and hamlets) Marziai and Caorera.

Vas bordered the following municipalities: Feltre, Lentiai, Quero, Segusino, Valdobbiadene.

On 28 December 2013 Vas merged with Quero to form the new municipality of Quero Vas.

Demographic evolution

References 

Frazioni of the Province of Belluno
Former municipalities of Veneto